Grace Carteret, 1st Countess Granville ( – 18 October 1744), formerly Lady Grace Granville, was Countess Granville in her own right and the wife of George Carteret, 1st Baron Carteret.

Early life
Grace was born at Stowe, Kilkhampton, Cornwall, the daughter of John Granville, 1st Earl of Bath, and his wife Jane Wyche. Some sources give her date of birth as 1654, which would have made her thirteen years older than her husband. However, their marriage took place in 1675, when she is said to have been "a mere child".

Marriage and issue
She married George Carteret, 1st Baron Carteret (1667-1695), who succeeded to his grandfather's baronetcy in 1680 and in 1681 was raised to the status of Baron Carteret.

The Carterets had two sons:
John Carteret, later 2nd Earl Granville (1690-1763), who was married twice: first, to Frances Worsley in 1710, and second, to Lady Sophia Fermor, in 1744. He had children by both marriages.
Philip Carteret (1692-1711), who died unmarried while a pupil at Westminster School and was buried at Westminster Abbey.

George Carteret died, aged 28 (or 26), in 1695.

Countess Granville
Grace's brother, Charles Granville, 2nd Earl of Bath, committed suicide a fortnight after the death of their father, and the earldom was inherited by his son, William, a minor. Following William's death in 1711, all Grace's elder siblings having predeceased her, she was created Viscountess Carteret and Countess Granville in her own right in 1714. She was able to pass on both titles to her elder son, John.

Grace Carteret died at the family seat of Hawnes in Bedfordshire, aged 77, a few months after attending her son's second marriage, to Sophia Fermor. She was buried in the vault of General Monk at Westminster Abbey.

References

1667 births
1744 deaths
British countesses
Carteret
Burials at Westminster Abbey
Carteret family
Daughters of British earls
Women ennobled by George I
Granville family
People from Kilkhampton
Earls Granville